Andrews Engelmann (23 March 1901 – 25 February 1992) was a Russian-born German actor. He worked primarily in Germany, where he specialised in playing Russian roles, but also appeared in a number of British films during his career. He was born as Andrei Engelman and also credited by various other names during his career including André von Engelman.

Selected filmography
 The Two Boys (1924)
 Mare Nostrum (1926)
 Education of a Prince (1927)
 Moulin Rouge (1928)
 Diary of a Lost Girl (1929)
 City of Play (1929)
 The Three Passions (1929)
 Cagliostro (1929)
 Two Worlds (1930)
 La Femme d'une nuit (1931)
 The Wandering Beast (1932)
 Baroud (1933)
 Refugees (1933)
 I Spy (1934)
 The Island (1934)
 The Crouching Beast (1935)
 Return to Paradise (1935)
 Stormy Weather (1935)
 Prison Breaker (1936)
 The Last Four on Santa Cruz (1936)
 Toilers of the Sea (1936)
 The Pearls of the Crown (1937)
 Faded Melody (1938)
 Water for Canitoga (1939)
 Legion Condor (1939)
 Cadets (1939)
 Commissioner Eyck (1940)
 Above All Else in the World (1941)
 Carl Peters (1941)
 Kora Terry (1940)
 The Red Terror (1942)
 Geheimakte W.B.1 (1942)
 Münchhausen (1943)
 Seven Letters (1944)
 The Appeal to Conscience (1949)
 The Secret of Mayerling (1949)
 Mystery in Shanghai (1950)
 Scandal at the Embassy (1950)
 The Case of Doctor Galloy  (1951)
 The Girl with the Whip (1952)
 The Secret of the Mountain Lake (1952)

Bibliography
 Hull, David S. Film in the Third Reich: A Study of the German Cinema, 1933-1945. University of California Press, 1969.

References

External links

1901 births
1992 deaths
German male film actors
German male silent film actors
Russian male film actors
Russian male silent film actors
Male actors from Saint Petersburg
20th-century German male actors
Emigrants from the Russian Empire to Germany